The Military Way is the modern name given to a Roman road constructed immediately to the south of Hadrian's Wall.

Establishment
Evidence has shown that the road was constructed before the abandonment of the turrets in the second century (linking roads between the Military Way and some turrets have been identified). The existence of the Stanegate suggests that it was not included in the original plan, and therefore it is likely to have been constructed soon after the reoccupation of Hadrian's Wall following the abandonment of the Antonine Wall in 162 AD.

Characteristics
As with most Roman roads, the Military Way was constructed from large stones, and surfaced with gravel. John Collingwood Bruce suggested that it was not intended for use by wheeled vehicles, and this is backed up by a survey of wall miles 40/41, where severe gradients up to 25% (33% in short stretches) were recorded.

Spurs have been identified linking the Military Way to some milecastles, for example Milecastle 9.

Some milestones have been found along the road (taking columnar form). These indicate that, in the third century, distances were numbered westwards from Dere Street.

Course
The Military Way runs along the top of the north mound of the Vallum in many places, and elsewhere runs between the Vallum and the curtain wall. At the river crossings at Chesters Bridge and at Willowford Bridge near Birdoswald Roman fort, the bridges were widened in the early third century to take the road, as opposed to just the walkway as was previously the case.

Present day
The course of the Military Way is still very much evident and walkable between Sewing Shields (near Milecastle 35) and Walltown Quarry (near Turret 45A). A public right of way follows the Military Way from Milking Gap (near Milecastle 38) to Walltown Quarry.

References

Hadrian's Wall
History of Northumberland
History of Cumbria
Roman roads in England
Archaeological sites in Cumbria
Archaeological sites in Northumberland